Acanthogonatus is a genus of South American mygalomorph spiders in the family Pycnothelidae. It was first described by Ferdinand Anton Franz Karsch in 1880. Originally placed with the brushed trapdoor spiders, it was transferred to the funnel-web trapdoor spiders in 1985, then to the Pycnothelidae in 2020.

Species
 it contains twenty-nine species, found in Uruguay, Peru, Brazil, Argentina, and Chile:
Acanthogonatus alegre Goloboff, 1995 – Chile
Acanthogonatus birabeni Goloboff, 1995 – Argentina
Acanthogonatus brunneus (Nicolet, 1849) – Chile
Acanthogonatus campanae (Legendre & Calderón, 1984) – Chile
Acanthogonatus centralis Goloboff, 1995 – Argentina
Acanthogonatus chilechico Goloboff, 1995 – Chile
Acanthogonatus confusus Goloboff, 1995 – Chile, Argentina
Acanthogonatus ericae Indicatti, Lucas, Ott & Brescovit, 2008 – Brazil
Acanthogonatus francki Karsch, 1880 (type) – Chile
Acanthogonatus fuegianus (Simon, 1902) – Chile, Argentina
Acanthogonatus hualpen Goloboff, 1995 – Chile
Acanthogonatus huaquen Goloboff, 1995 – Chile
Acanthogonatus incursus (Chamberlin, 1916) – Peru
Acanthogonatus juncal Goloboff, 1995 – Chile
Acanthogonatus minimus Indicatti, Folly-Ramos, Vargas, Lucas & Brescovit, 2015 – Brazil
Acanthogonatus mulchen Goloboff, 1995 – Chile
Acanthogonatus nahuelbuta Goloboff, 1995 – Chile
Acanthogonatus notatus (Mello-Leitão, 1940) – Argentina
Acanthogonatus parana Goloboff, 1995 – Argentina
Acanthogonatus patagallina Goloboff, 1995 – Chile
Acanthogonatus patagonicus (Simon, 1905) – Chile, Argentina
Acanthogonatus peniasco Goloboff, 1995 – Chile
Acanthogonatus pissii (Simon, 1889) – Chile
Acanthogonatus quilocura Goloboff, 1995 – Chile
Acanthogonatus recinto Goloboff, 1995 – Chile
Acanthogonatus subcalpeianus (Nicolet, 1849) – Chile
Acanthogonatus tacuariensis (Pérez-Miles & Capocasale, 1982) – Brazil, Uruguay
Acanthogonatus tolhuaca Goloboff, 1995 – Chile
Acanthogonatus vilches Goloboff, 1995 – Chile

Formerly included:
A. argentina (Simon, 1897) (Transferred to Stenoterommata)

Nomen dubium
A. gounellei (Simon, 1886

See also
 List of Pycnothelidae species

References

Further reading

Mygalomorphae genera
Pycnothelidae
Spiders of South America